Eyfura was a princess in Norse mythology, who married Arngrim and had twelve sons. In all accounts, her twelve sons would be slain by the Swedish champion Hjalmar and his friend Orvar-Odd.

According to the Hervarar saga, versions U and H, she was the daughter of Svafrlami, the king of Gardariki. Her father was slain by Arngrim who took Eyfura as his wife by force. According to version R, her father's name was Sigrlami and he gave Eyfura to Arngrim in recompense for his services as war-chief.

In the Gesta Danorum, by Saxo Grammaticus, she was a Danish princess and the daughter of king Frodi. Arngrim asked for her hand, but it was only after Arngrim had defeated the Saamis, and the Bjarmians that Frodi agreed to let her marry Arngrim.

Sources
Hervarar saga
Gesta Danorum

Legendary Norsemen
Mythological princesses